Travis Best (born July 12, 1972) is an American former professional basketball player, who played in the National Basketball Association (NBA) and in Europe.

High school career

Best attended Springfield Central High School, starring on teams that amassed a 69–4 record in his three seasons, earning the Lahovich Award as the top player in Western Massachusetts from 1989–91. After his junior season, he was named a second-team Parade All-American. During his senior season, Best scored a state-record 81 points in a single game.  With then-sophomore teammate Edgar Padilla, a future UMass standout, Best led his 25–0 team to the 1991 Division I state championship and a No. 15 ranking in the final USA Today Top 25. After earning Gatorade's Massachusetts and New England Player of the Year honors, Best was selected to play in both the McDonald's All-American Game and McDonald's Capital Classic, earning first-team Parade All-American honors and being the only guard chosen for USA Today's All-USA first team. After considering both UConn and the University of Virginia, Best chose Georgia Tech.

Collegiate career

At Georgia Tech, Best teamed with fellow McDonald's All-American James Forrest for four years. The duo lead the Yellow Jackets to the 1993 ACC tournament championship, their first since 1990. Best was named to the All-ACC third-team as a sophomore, earning second-team honors as a junior and as a senior. Best led the ACC in assist-to-turnover ratio and free-throw percentage as a senior, while capturing ACC Player of the Week honors a league-record five times. 

Best ranked in the top six in Tech history in points, assists, minutes, 3-point field goals made and steals at the conclusion of his collegiate career. He was one of only three ACC players to score 2,000 points with 600 assists (UNC's Phil Ford and Maryland's Greivis Vasquez are the other two).  He earned honorable-mention All-America honors from The Associated Press and was a nominee for the Frances Pomeroy Naismith Award, given to the best player in the nation under .

Professional career
Best was drafted 23rd in the 1995 NBA draft by the Indiana Pacers. He played for the Pacers, the Chicago Bulls, the Miami Heat, the Dallas Mavericks and the New Jersey Nets, averaging 7.6 points and 3.5 assists per game.

Best was a vital backup at point guard on the 1999–2000 Indiana team that went to the 2000 NBA Finals. Best hit the game-winning 3-pointer in the decisive fifth game against the Milwaukee Bucks in the first round of the playoffs. During the 2001–2002 season, he requested a trade and was granted one to the Chicago Bulls. The Bulls traded Ron Artest, Brad Miller, Ron Mercer and Kevin Ollie to the Pacers for Best, Jalen Rose and Norman Richardson, adding a future second-round pick.

Best had a small role in the 1998 Spike Lee film He Got Game, which also featured NBA players Ray Allen, Walter McCarty, John Wallace, and Rick Fox.

Personal life
Travis also has a cameo in 1998 film He Got Game as ”Sip”  

Travis lives in the Springfield metropolitan area with his girlfriend "Michelle Kathleen" Brodeur.

References

External links
 NBA.com Profile
Euroleague.net Player Profile
masslive Best, Travis Profile

1972 births
Living people
American expatriate basketball people in Italy
American expatriate basketball people in Poland
American expatriate basketball people in Russia
American men's basketball players
Asseco Gdynia players
Basketball players from Springfield, Massachusetts
BC UNICS players
Chicago Bulls players
Dallas Mavericks players
Georgia Tech Yellow Jackets men's basketball players
Indiana Pacers draft picks
Indiana Pacers players
McDonald's High School All-Americans
Miami Heat players
New Jersey Nets players
Parade High School All-Americans (boys' basketball)
Point guards